Eric J. van den Steen is a Belgian-American economist, currently the Royal Little Professor of Business Administration at Harvard Business School.

References

Year of birth missing (living people)
Living people
Harvard Business School faculty
American economists
Belgian economists
University of Chicago alumni
Stanford University alumni